In Greek mythology the Graeae (English translation: "old women", alternatively spelled Graiai and Graiae) were three sisters who had gray hair from their birth and shared one eye and one tooth among them. They were also called the Grey Sisters and the Phorcides ("daughters of Phorcys") (not to be confused with the three Gorgons, who were also daughters of Phorcys and were also called Phorcides).

Names
Their names were:
 Deino (or Dino) (Δεινώ)
 Enyo (Ἐνυώ)
 Pemphredo (Πεμφρηδώ) or Pephredo (Πεφρηδώ)

Etymology

The word Graeae is probably derived from the adjective   "old woman", derived from the Proto-Indo-European root  , "to grow old" via .

Mythology
The Graeae were daughters of the sea-deities Ceto and Phorcys (from which their name the Phorcydes derived) and sisters to the Gorgons. The Graeae took the form of old, grey-haired women. Their age was so great that a human childhood for them was hardly conceivable. In Theogony, however, Hesiod describes the Graeae as being "fair-cheeked". In Prometheus Bound, the Graeae are described as being swan-shaped ("κυκνόμορφοι")

Hesiod names only two Graeae, the  "well-clad" Pemphredo (Πεμφρηδώ "alarm") and the "saffron-robed" Enyo (Ἐνυώ "horror" the "waster of cities" who also had an identity separate from this sisterhood). Pseudo-Apollodorus lists Deino (Δεινώ "dread", the dreadful anticipation of horror) as a third. Calling them "Phorcides", Hyginus, in addition to Pemphredo and Enyo, adds Persis noting that "for this last others say Dino".

They shared one eye and one tooth, which they took turns using. By stealing their eye while they were passing it among themselves, the hero Perseus forced them to tell the whereabouts of the three objects needed to kill Medusa (in other versions the whereabouts of Medusa) by ransoming their shared eye for the information.

Genealogy

Notes

References

Bibliography 

 Apollodorus, Apollodorus, The Library, with an English Translation by Sir James George Frazer, F.B.A., F.R.S. in 2 Volumes. Cambridge, Massachusetts, Harvard University Press; London, William Heinemann Ltd. 1921.  Online version at the Perseus Digital Library.
 Aeschylus. Fragments. Edited and translated by Alan H. Sommerstein. Loeb Classical Library No. 505. Cambridge, Massachusetts: Harvard University Press, 2009. . Online version at Harvard University Press
 Aeschylus, Persians. Seven against Thebes. Suppliants. Prometheus Bound. Edited and translated by Alan H. Sommerstein. Loeb Classical Library No. 145. Cambridge, Massachusetts: Harvard University Press, 2009. . Online version at Harvard University Press
 Apollodorus, Apollodorus, The Library, with an English Translation by Sir James George Frazer, F.B.A., F.R.S. in 2 Volumes. Cambridge, Massachusetts, Harvard University Press; London, William Heinemann Ltd. 1921.  Online version at the Perseus Digital Library.
 Grimal, Pierre, The Dictionary of Classical Mythology, Wiley-Blackwell, 1996, . "Graeae" p. 175.
 Hesiod, Theogony, in The Homeric Hymns and Homerica with an English Translation by Hugh G. Evelyn-White, Cambridge, Massachusetts., Harvard University Press; London, William Heinemann Ltd. 1914. Online version at the Perseus Digital Library.
 Hyginus, Gaius Julius, The Myths of Hyginus. Edited and translated by Mary A. Grant, Lawrence: University of Kansas Press, 1960.
 Smith, William; Dictionary of Greek and Roman Biography and Mythology, London (1873). "Graeae"

External links

The Theoi Project, "GRAIAI" 

Mythological blind people
Greek goddesses